Peter Pekarík (born 30 October 1986) is a Slovak professional footballer who plays as a right-back for Bundesliga club Hertha BSC and the Slovakia national team.

Club career

Žilina
Pekarík, born in Žilina, began playing football at the youth section of his local club. His Corgoň Liga debut came for ZŤS Dubnica. In his first season, he played 27 matches and came back to MŠK Žilina in the summer of 2005. He won the Corgoň Liga in the 2006–07 season, playing 35 matches.

VfL Wolfsburg
Pekarík impressed with great performances in the first half of the 2008–09 season and signed a four-and-a-half-year contract for Bundesliga side VfL Wolfsburg in January 2009.

On 31 January 2009, matchday 18, he debuted in the Bundesliga in a 1–1 draw against the 1. FC Köln. At half time, coach Felix Magath substituted him for Cristian Zaccardo. Except for one game, he played in the second half of the season in all games and won with Wolfsburg for the first time in club history the German championship. However, at the end of the season he was substituted more often and lost his place in the starting eleven.

Kayserispor
In August 2011, Pekarík joined Turkish first division side Kayserispor for the 2011–12 season on loan.

Hertha BSC
After a year in Turkey, Pekarík returned to Germany, signing for Hertha BSC.

On 31 March 2017, in his eighth season in Germany, Pekarík scored his first Bundesliga goal in a 3–1 loss against 1899 Hoffenheim. At the moment it was his 151st Bundesliga match.

International career
Pekarík made his Slovakia national team debut against United Arab Emirates on 10 December 2006. He scored his first international goal in a 7–0 home victory over San Marino. He was a part of the Slovakia team at the 2010 FIFA World Cup, UEFA Euro 2016 and UEFA Euro 2020. On 1 June 2021, he played his 100th match for Slovakia in a 1–1 draw in a friendly match against Bulgaria.

Career statistics

Club

International

Scores and results list Slovakia's goal tally first, score column indicates score after each Pekarík goal.

Honours
MŠK Žilina
 Fortuna Liga: 2006–07
 Slovak Super Cup: 2007

VfL Wolfsburg
 Bundesliga: 2008–09

Hertha BSC
 2. Bundesliga: 2012–13

Slovakia
King's Cup: 2018

See also
 List of men's footballers with 100 or more international caps

References

External links

 Profile at the Hertha BSC website
 
 
 

Living people
1986 births
Sportspeople from Žilina
Slovak footballers
Association football fullbacks
Slovakia international footballers
2010 FIFA World Cup players
UEFA Euro 2016 players
UEFA Euro 2020 players
Slovak Super Liga players
Bundesliga players
2. Bundesliga players
Süper Lig players
MŠK Žilina players
FK Dubnica players
VfL Wolfsburg players
Kayserispor footballers
Hertha BSC players
Slovak expatriate footballers
Expatriate footballers in Germany
Slovak expatriate sportspeople in Germany
Expatriate footballers in Turkey
Slovak expatriate sportspeople in Turkey
FIFA Century Club